The Peter Kremer House is a historic house museum in Minnesota Lake, Minnesota, United States. The Minnesota Lake Historical Society operates the house as the Kremer House Library and Museum.

Built in 1902, it was the home of a French immigrant and his wife, Millie Zabel of Prussia, who both served as business and civic leaders in the community.

See also
 National Register of Historic Places listings in Faribault County, Minnesota

References

External links
 Kremer House Library and Museum

Historic house museums in Minnesota
Houses completed in 1902
National Register of Historic Places in Faribault County, Minnesota
Houses on the National Register of Historic Places in Minnesota
Queen Anne architecture in Minnesota